is a terminal train station of JR Kyushu Nichinan Line in Shibushi, Kagoshima, Japan.

Lines 
Kyushu Railway Company
Nichinan Line

JR

Adjacent stations

Gallery

Nearby places 
Port of Shibushi
Shibushi City Hall
Shibushi Post Office

Railway stations in Japan opened in 1925
Railway stations in Kagoshima Prefecture